Anderson Freitas Henriques (born 3 March 1992) is a Brazilian sprinter.

Anderson left his hometown, Caçapava do Sul, and moved to Porto Alegre in early 2010 when he was about to turn 18. It was when he began to take athletics more seriously, began to train in Sogipa, and discovered a vocation for the 400m. Anderson compensated for his late start with rapid growth. Now in his debut year, he completed the race in 46s24.

He won the gold medal in the 400 metres at the 2011 South American Junior Championships in Athletics in Medellín, Colombia.

At the 2011 Pan American Games in Guadalajara, he was a finalist, finishing 8th. If not for a fever of 38 degrees, Anderson would have fought for medals.

At the 2011 Universiade, in Shenzhen, he was a finalist, finishing in 7th place.

At the 2013 Universiade in Kazan, Anderson won the silver medal.

At the 2013 World Championships in Moscow, in the 400m, Henriques broke the 45-second barrier for the first time (he completed the distance in 44s95), and first came to a World Championships final.

He competed at the 2020 Summer Olympics.

Personal bests
200 m: 20.85 s (wind: +1.2 m/s) –  Oordegem, 5 July 2014
400 m: 44.95 s (semi final) –  Moscow, 12 August 2013
400 m (indoor): 46.82 s –  Sopot, 7 March 2014

International competitions

References

External links

Tilastopaja biography

1992 births
Living people
Brazilian male sprinters
Universiade medalists in athletics (track and field)
South American Games gold medalists for Brazil
South American Games medalists in athletics
Competitors at the 2014 South American Games
Universiade silver medalists for Brazil
Competitors at the 2011 Summer Universiade
Medalists at the 2013 Summer Universiade
Athletes (track and field) at the 2011 Pan American Games
Pan American Games athletes for Brazil
Athletes (track and field) at the 2020 Summer Olympics
Olympic athletes of Brazil
21st-century Brazilian people